Paul Albert Ammann (7 October 1860 – 4 June 1929) was a Swiss politician and President of the Swiss Council of States (1905/1906).

External links 
 
 

1860 births
1929 deaths
Members of the Council of States (Switzerland)
Presidents of the Council of States (Switzerland)